Seneca is a town in Wood County, Wisconsin, United States. The population was 1,202 at the 2000 census.

Geography
According to the United States Census Bureau, the town has a total area of 32.4 square miles (84.0 km2), of which, 32.2 square miles (83.5 km2) of it is land and 0.2 square miles (0.5 km2) of it (0.59%) is water.

History
The east end of Seneca, within three miles of the Wisconsin River, was in the "Indian strip," sold by the Menominee to the U.S. government in the 1836 Treaty of the Cedars. As such, it was logged and surveyed early. In 1839 a crew working for the U.S. government surveyed what would become the east and south edges of Seneca, walking through the woods and crossing the river, measuring with chain and compass. In 1851 a different crew surveyed the section lines of the eastern six mile square of what is now Seneca, producing this general description:
The East & South East portion of this Town consists of alternate ridges of pine barrens and Tamarack Swamps. There is a small portion of land near the river that is tolerably fair but the bottoms on the river are worthless(?) owing to their being overflowed nearly every year. The West & north parts of the Town consist of a portion of the great Cranberry Marsh which extends to & beyond Yellow river. The Marsh is wet & unfit for cultivation & has upon it small Islands (so called) of hard land  with a few trees; Scattering Pines, Tamarack & Blk Oak are found nearly all over it so much so that we almost invariably found bearing trees for our corners. The Marsh may be valuable for the Cranberries which it produces abundantly but otherwise is entirely(?) worthless(?).

Seneca township took its name from the now-extinct hamlet of Seneca, which was located within its borders.

Demographics
As of the census of 2000, there were 1,202 people, 408 households, and 330 families residing in the town.  The population density was 37.3 people per square mile (14.4/km2).  There were 422 housing units at an average density of 13.1 per square mile (5.1/km2).  The racial makeup of the town was 90.68% White, 5.99% Native American, 2.33% Asian, and 1.00% from two or more races. Hispanic or Latino of any race were 0.92% of the population.

There were 408 households, out of which 38.0% had children under the age of 18 living with them, 71.1% were married couples living together, 6.4% had a female householder with no husband present, and 18.9% were non-families. 14.5% of all households were made up of individuals, and 6.1% had someone living alone who was 65 years of age or older.  The average household size was 2.94 and the average family size was 3.27.

In the town, the population was spread out, with 28.8% under the age of 18, 7.0% from 18 to 24, 29.5% from 25 to 44, 23.5% from 45 to 64, and 11.1% who were 65 years of age or older.  The median age was 37 years. For every 100 females, there were 104.1 males.  For every 100 females age 18 and over, there were 101.9 males.

The median income for a household in the town was $54,118, and the median income for a family was $58,750. Males had a median income of $39,375 versus $26,974 for females. The per capita income for the town was $21,833.  About 3.0% of families and 6.0% of the population were below the poverty line, including 5.4% of those under age 18 and 15.4% of those age 65 or over.

References

External links 
 1852 plat map covering eastern part of town of Seneca (for plats of the western part, see Cranmoor)
 1879 plat map of eastern part
 1896 plat map of eastern part
 1909 plat map
 1928 plat map
 1956 plat map of eastern part

Towns in Wood County, Wisconsin
Towns in Wisconsin